John Audley  may refer to:

John Tuchet, 6th Baron Audley (1423–1490), English peer
John Tuchet, 8th Baron Audley (c. 1483 – c. 1557), English peer
John Awdely (fl. 1559–1577), English printer and writer
John Audley (died 1588), 16th-century English politician, MP for West Looe and Bodmin
John Awdeley (fl. 1593), 16th-century English politician
John Audelay, 15th century English religious poet.